The Sayville Yacht Club is a private yacht club with its facilities located in Blue Point, New York. It was founded in Sayville, New York before the First World War. The club fell on hard times during the Great Depression and became inactive. After the Second World War, a group of local residents and war veterans reclaimed the club's charter and relocated the SYC to its present location. Land was acquired and the club's first clubhouse, a Victorian bath house, was floated from Cherry Grove, New York. Early Commodores of the Sayville Yacht Club included many of those active in re-activating the club; including George C. Palmer, Douglas Westin, George Heinrich and others.

The SYC is today one of the leading yacht racing clubs on the Great South Bay specializing in dinghy racing. The SYC has hosted events such as the Laser U.S. Nationals, Thistle Nationals, Sunfish North Americans, and much more.

External links
Official Site

Brookhaven, New York
Islip (town), New York
Sailing in New York (state)
Yacht clubs in the United States